Crossgates is a hamlet in Cumbria, England. It is located just to the northeast of Asby.

References

Hamlets in Cumbria
Borough of Copeland